Puka Ranra (Quechua puka red, ranra stony; stony ground, "red, stony ground", also spelled Pucaranra) is a mountain in the Cordillera Negra in the Andes of Peru which reaches a height of approximately . It is located in the Ancash Region, Yungay Province, Quillo District. Puka Ranra lies southwest of a lake named Qanchisqucha (Quechua for "seven lakes").

References

Mountains of Peru
Mountains of Ancash Region